The Wando River, a perennial river of the Glenelg Hopkins catchment, is located in the Western District of Victoria, Australia.

Location and features
The river descends  over its  course.

See also

 List of rivers in Victoria

References

Glenelg Hopkins catchment
Rivers of Barwon South West (region)
Western District (Victoria)